Vera Jeftimijades (born 25 May 1937) is a Yugoslav fencer. She competed in the women's individual foil event at the 1960 Summer Olympics.

References

External links
 

1937 births
Living people
Serbian female foil fencers
Yugoslav female foil fencers
Olympic fencers of Yugoslavia
Fencers at the 1960 Summer Olympics
Sportspeople from Belgrade
Mediterranean Games bronze medalists for Yugoslavia
Competitors at the 1971 Mediterranean Games
Mediterranean Games medalists in fencing